Achrioptera is a genus of stick insects first described in 1861. It is one of two genera in the tribe Achriopterini, the other being Glawiana. Species in the genus Achrioptera occur in Africa, including Madagascar. Although they are brightly colored, members of Achrioptera are able to effectively mimic thorny twigs and sticks for camouflage.

Species 
It includes the following species:
 Achrioptera cliquennoisi Hennemann & Conle, 2004
 Achrioptera fallax Coquerel, 1861
 Achrioptera gracilis Hennemann & Conle, 2004
 Achrioptera griveaudi Paulian, 1960
 Achrioptera hugeli Cliquennois, 2021
 Achrioptera impennis Redtenbacher, 1908
 Achrioptera lobipes (Rehn, 1940)
 Achrioptera magnifica Hennemann & Conle, 2004
 Achrioptera manga (Glaw, Hawlitschek, Dunz, Goldberg & Bradler, 2019)
 Achrioptera maroloko (Glaw, Hawlitschek, Dunz, Goldberg & Bradler, 2019)
 Achrioptera punctipes (Audinet-Serville, 1838)
 Achrioptera pygmaea Redtenbacher, 1908
 Achrioptera spinosissima (Kirby, 1891)

References

Phasmatodea genera
Insects of Africa
Taxa named by Charles Coquerel